International sanctions are political and economic decisions that are part of diplomatic efforts by countries, multilateral or regional organizations against states or organizations either to protect national security interests, or to protect international law, and defend against threats to international peace and security. These decisions principally include the temporary imposition on a target of economic, trade, diplomatic, cultural or other restrictions (sanctions measures) that are lifted when the motivating security concerns no longer apply, or when no new threats have arisen.

According to Chapter VII of the United Nations Charter, only the UN Security Council has a mandate by the international community to apply sanctions (Article 41) that must be complied with by all UN member states (Article 2,2). They serve as the international community's most powerful peaceful means to prevent threats to international peace and security or to settle them. Sanctions do not include the use of military force. However, if sanctions do not lead to the diplomatic settlement of a conflict, the use of force can be authorized by the Security Council separately under Article 42.

UN sanctions should not be confused with unilateral sanctions that are imposed by individual countries in furtherance of their strategic interests. Typically intended as strong economic coercion, measures applied under unilateral sanctions can range between coercive diplomatic efforts, economic warfare, or as preludes to war.

There are several types of sanctions.
Economic sanctions – typically a ban on trade, possibly limited to certain sectors such as armaments, or with certain exceptions (such as food and medicine)
Diplomatic sanctions – the reduction or removal of diplomatic ties, such as embassies.
Military sanctions – military intervention
Sport sanctions – preventing one country's people and teams from competing in international events.
Sanctions on the environment – since the declaration of the United Nations Conference on the Human Environment, international environmental protection efforts have been increased gradually.

Economic sanctions are distinguished from trade sanctions, which are applied for purely economic reasons, and typically take the form of tariffs or similar measures, rather than bans on trade.

Types

Reasons for sanctioning
Sanctions formulations are designed into three categories. The categories are used to differentiate between the political contexts due to the global nature of the act.

The first category involves such sanctions that are designed to force cooperation with international law. This can be seen in the sanctions placed on Iraq in Resolution 661 on August 6, 1990, after the initial invasion of neighboring Kuwait. The United Nations placed an embargo on the nation in an attempt to prevent armed conflict. Resolution 665 and Resolution 670 were further added creating both naval and air blockade on Iraq. The purpose of the initial sanctions was to coerce Iraq into following international law, which included the recognized sovereignty of Kuwait.

The second category of design is those sanctions with the purpose to contain a threat to peace within a geographical boundary. The 2010 Iran nuclear proliferation debate is a contemporary example. The current United Nations Security Council passed on June 9, Resolution 1929 providing restrictions on missile and weaponry materials that could be used for the creation of destructive weapons. This principle of restriction is to contain the possibility of Iranian aggression within the neighboring region.

The third category involves the United Nations Security Councils condemnation of actions of a specific action or policy of a member/non-member nation. The white minority declared Rhodesian Independence on November 11, 1965. The General assemble and United Nations in a 107 to 2 vote took to condemning Rhodesia on all military, economic, as well as oil and petroleum products. The international display of disapproval forced sanctions onto the Rhodesian people, but without a clear goal as to a remedy for the economic sanctions.

The three categories are a blanket explanation on the reasons sanctions are applied to nations, but it does not go as far as to say that voting members share the same political reasons for imposing them. It is often the case for many nations to be driven by self-interests in one or more categories when voting on whether or not to implement sanctions.

Economic sanctions

Economic sanctions can vary from trade barriers, tariffs, and restrictions on financial transactions. These types of sanctions impose import duties on goods or bans on the export of certain goods to the target country, to a full naval blockade of the target's ports in an effort to block imported goods. The objective of the sanctioning country are to impose significant costs to the target country to coerce a change in policy or attain a specific action from the target government. However, the effectiveness of economic sanctions has been challenged, as its harsh impacts cause more harm to the general population rather than the target regimes it is designed to hurt.

Diplomatic sanctions
Diplomatic sanctions are political measures taken to express disapproval or displeasure at a certain action through diplomatic and political means, rather than affecting economic or military relations. Measures include limitations or cancellations of high-level government visits or expelling or withdrawing diplomatic missions or staff.

Military sanctions
Similarly military sanctions can range from carefully targeted military strikes to degrade a nation's conventional or non-conventional capabilities, to the less aggressive form of an arms embargo to cut off supplies of arms or dual-use items.

Sport sanctions
Sport sanctions are used as a way of psychological warfare, intended to crush the morale of the general population of the target country. Sports sanctions were imposed as part of the international sanctions against Federal Republic of Yugoslavia, 1992–1995, enacted by UN Security Council by resolution 757. The Gleneagles Agreement approved by the Commonwealth of Nations in 1977, committed member nations to discourage contact and competition between their sportsmen and sporting organisations, teams or individuals from South Africa. However, it was not binding and unable to stop events such as the 1980 British Lions tour to South Africa or the 1981 South Africa rugby union tour of New Zealand. During the 2022 Russian invasion of Ukraine, many sporting bodies imposed sport sanctions against Russia and Belarus. The target countries are usually not allowed to host any sporting events and not allowed to have their flag and state symbol displayed.

Sanctions on the environment
Sanctions on the environment include both economic and political issues such as trade since these are all interdependent. The trade barriers and restrictions on trade are the key factors since they are engaged with the problems of endangered species, ozone-depleting chemicals, and environmental laws. Although the sanctions and laws regarding the environment are relatively new, recent concerns over the environmental issues encouraged individuals and governments to actively cooperate in dealing the problems.

Sanctions on individuals
The United Nations Security Council can implement sanctions on political leaders or economic individuals. These persons usually find ways of evading their sanction because of political connections within their nation.

Sanctions in international law
It is sometimes claimed that sanctions imposed by single countries or by an intergovernmental body like the United Nations are "illegal" or "criminal" due to, in the case of economic sanctions, the right to development or, in the case of military sanctions, the Right of self-defense.

A 1996 report by International Progress Organization criticized sanctions as "an illegitimate form of collective punishment of the weakest and poorest members of society, the infants, the children, the chronically ill, and the elderly".

Support for use
Sanctions have long been the subject of controversy as scholars question their effects on citizens, the level of ethnocentrism involved when designing and implementing sanctions, and the possibility of ineffectiveness.

Supporters of sanctions argue that regardless of sanctions' effects on a group of people, those citizens were most likely already being oppressed by their government. Supporters also argue that sanctions are the best alternative international tool, as opposed to taking no action, and that in the absence of sanctions, oppressive regimes have no incentive to reform.

On the side of opposition, it is asserted that sanctions are a way to promote nationalistic values and diminish the culture of a state. In counterargument, support is argued on the basis that something must be done and democratic peace theory is cited as sound reasoning despite any possible cultural insensitivity. 

In regards to the effectiveness of the sanctions, supporters concede that multilateral sanctions have been found to work 33% of the time.

There are several ways to remove and dissolve sanctions that have been imposed on a nation(s). In some cases, such as those imposed on Iraq in 1990, only a new resolution can be used to lift the sanctions. This is done when no provision is put in the resolution for the lifting of sanctions. This is generally only done if the sanctioned party has shown willingness to adopt certain conditions of the Security Council. Another way sanctions can be lifted is when time limits are implemented with the initial sanction. After an extended duration, the sanction will eventually be lifted off the nation, with or without cooperation. The practice of time limitations has grown over the years and allows for a gradual removal of restrictions on nations conforming, at least in part, to conditions imposed by sanctioning bodies, such as the U.N. Security Council.

See also
 Autarky
 Boycott
 Enforcement
 Accountability
 Humanitarian intervention
 Sanctions involving Russia
 India sanctions
 United States sanctions
 Dima Yakovlev Law
 Magnitsky Act
 Interdict

References

Further reading
 Condon, Bradly J, Environmental Sovereignty and the WTO : Trade Sanctions and International Law (2006)
 Ashouri, Mahan "The Role of transnational Private Actors in Ukrain International Flight 752 Crash in Iran Under Economic Sanctions Pressure" (2021)

 
Economic policy